Mukoy Airport  is a grass airstrip serving the hamlet of Mukoy in Tanganyika Province, Democratic Republic of the Congo.

See also

Transport in the Democratic Republic of the Congo
List of airports in the Democratic Republic of the Congo

References

External links
 FallingRain - Mukoy Airport
 OpenStreetMap - Mukoy
 HERE Maps - Mukoy
 OurAirports - Mukoy
 

Airports in Tanganyika Province